Westerwald Pottery or Stoneware is a distinctive type of salt glazed grey pottery from the Höhr-Grenzhausen and Ransbach-Baumbach area of Westerwaldkreis in Rheinland-Pfalz, Germany.

It is known as Kannenbäckerland Stoneware. Typically it is decorated with cobalt blue painted designs, though the collectable items are more multicoloured. 

There is a pottery museum at Höhr-Grenzhausen that displays the construction techniques and the history of salt glaze.

German pottery
Westerwaldkreis
History of the Westerwald